Ostel  is a commune in France.

 Ostel  may also refer to:

Ostel (Berlin), a hostel in Berlin, Germany
An open-source telephony application, see The Guardian Project (software)

See also
Ostell
Osstell